The White Bridge is a pedestrian bridge over the Neris River in Vilnius, Lithuania. It connects Naujamiestis with the district of Šnipiškės. The bridge was built in 1996.

Sculpture
Bridge is decorated with a sculpture called Spindulys-Ietis (English: Ray-Spear).

References

Bridges in Vilnius
Pedestrian bridges in Lithuania
Bridges completed in 1996